Sturgeon Creek is a stream in the U.S. state of Washington.

Sturgeon Creek's name is an accurate preservation of its Indian name.

See also
List of rivers of Washington

References

Rivers of Snohomish County, Washington
Rivers of Washington (state)